is a district in Kushiro Subprefecture, Hokkaido. Kushiro is also the name of the adjacent city Kushiro, Hokkaido.

Towns 
Kushiro

History 
August 1, 1922 Kushiro-ku becomes Kushiro City, leaving the district
October 10, 1949 Tottori Town (鳥取町) merges with Kushiro City

Districts in Hokkaido